The Moral Constitution is a means of understanding the U.S. Constitution which emphasizes a fusion of moral philosophy and constitutional law. The most prominent proponent is Ronald Dworkin, who advances the view in Law's Empire and Freedom's Law: The Moral Reading of the American Constitution. Alternatively, it can be taken to mean a constitution that defines the fundamental political principles and establishes the power and duties of each government, and does so while being consistent with a moral code. The moral code can take any of the same forms as the constitution itself: written, unwritten, codified, uncodified, etc. Former Chief Justice of Indonesian Constitutional Court, Jimly Asshiddiqie, also wrote his book on "The Court of Ethics and Constitutional Ethics" (2014) advocating a new perspective on the 'rule of ethics' besides the doctrine of the 'rule of law'.

This interpretation of the Constitution intends to create a change in the application of law and in particular Constitutional Law from a rule of law paradigm to a morality-based paradigm, and would require the explanation and description of the moral code as a principle of operation of the government specified in the constitution as a fundamental component of its structure.

The description of a rule of morality, or moral code can come in two forms. It can be a set of rules, such as the biblical Ten Commandments, and is the form of most legal systems of government today. Alternatively, it can be a set of principles, or a moral code. This alternative definition of a concept of a Moral Constitution finds its only current example in the Bill of Morals efforts of the present government of South Africa.

See also
 Constitutionalism
 Constitutional economics
 Rule according to higher law

United States constitutional commentary